Solène Ndama (born 23 September 1998) is a French athlete competing in the 100 metres hurdles, heptathlon and pentathlon.

Personal life
Born in France, Ndama is of Gabonese descent.

Career
Ndama won the gold medal in the 100 metres hurdles at the 2017 European U20 Championships. She also made the final in the same event at the 2018 European Championships but was disqualified in it.

Ndama won the bronze medal and equalled Antoinette Nana Djimou's 8-year-old French national record of 4,723 points in the pentathlon at the 2019 European Athletics Indoor Championships.

International competitions

1Disqualified in the final

Personal bests
Outdoor
200 metres – 24.05 (+1.8 m/s, Albi 2018)
800 metres – 2:11.97 (Talence 2019)
100 metres hurdles – 12.77 (+0.2	Berlin 2018)
High jump – 1.75 (Talence 2019))
Long jump – 6.38 (+0.8 m/s, Talence 2019))
Shot put – 13.68 (Doha 2019)
Javelin throw – 37.62 (Doha 2019)
Heptathlon – 6290 (Talence 2019)

Indoor
60 metres – 7.83 (Bordeaux 2016)
800 metres – 2:11.92 (Glasgow 2019)
60 metres hurdles – 8.03 (Nantes 2019)
High jump – 1.78 (Glasgow 2019)
Long jump – 6.27 (Miramas 2019)
Shot put – 14.47 (Miramas 2019)
Pentathlon – 4723 (Glasgow 2019)

References

1998 births
Living people
French female hurdlers
French heptathletes
French sportspeople of Gabonese descent
Sportspeople from Bordeaux